The Brittany is a breed of gun dog bred primarily for bird hunting.  Although it is often referred to as the Brittany Spaniel, they are not actually spaniels. The AKC reclassified them in 1984 as just Brittanys, since they are pointing dogs and have less genetically in common with Spaniels, and more in common with Setters, which are pointing dogs. The breed's working characteristics are more akin to those of a pointer or setter than a spaniel. 

Brittanys were developed in Brittany, a province in northwest France, between the 17th and 19th centuries, becoming officially recognized early in the 20th.  There are French Brittanys as well as American Brittanys. French Brittanys are used for upland birds and rabbits, whereas the American Brittanys are used for upland birds hunting exclusively.

History
The name "Brittany" is taken from the Brittany region in northwestern France where the dog originated. Images of orange and white Brittany-like dogs hunting and retrieving game were first seen on tapestries and paintings from the 17th century. The first written and verifiable record of Brittanys comes from a hunting description written by Reverend Davies in 1850. He described hunting with small "bobtailed" dogs who pointed and were excellent retrievers. It was around the same time that the modern Brittany is rumored to have been bred by mating with English Setters.

The Brittany was first recognized as a breed in 1907 when an orange and white male named Boy was registered in France. As a result, the first standards were outlined in the same year. America recognized the Brittany in 1931 and the breed was approved by the American Kennel Club in 1934. In 1982 the "Spaniel" was officially dropped from the name.

Description

Appearance
The Brittany is typically quite athletic, compact, energetic, and solidly built without being heavy.  Their heads are of average size with floppy ears, expressions usually of intelligence, vigour, and alertness, and gait elastic, long, and free.

Yet sometimes they are born with short tails.

The breed's coat color is varied: orange and white coat or liver and white are most common in the American Brittany; other colors include orange roan and liver roan, all of which are acceptable in the show ring. The American Brittany Standard specifies an acceptable tri-color of liver, orange, and white with very specific color placement. Some Brittanys may have a dark brown coat, which is rare.

Size
Brittanys are medium-sized dogs, with American lines ( at the withers according to an AKC standard adopted in 1990) tending to be larger and have a blockier head than French, and females at the lower end. Generally, Brittanys are smaller than setters but leggier than spaniels.

Types
Many breeders differentiate between "American" Brittanys and "French"-style dogs.  Although generally recognized as subsets of the same breed, there are recognizable differences between the two. The "American Brittany" is typically larger than the "French Brittany" and a bigger running dog, while the smaller French Brittany generally works more closely to the guns, but will work according to the local terrain. However, some breeders consider these "differences" to be unsound generalizations and that American standards should be updated to reflect the breed's standard in its country of origin; i.e. France, where black has become an acceptable coat color since 1956, while it is still considered a fault in America.

Though it resembles a spaniel-like dog used for flushing game, such as Springers and Cockers, Brittanys are more akin to pointers and all-purpose sporting dogs. Known in the United Kingdom as an HPR breed (Hunt, Point and Retrieve), they are expected to point and retrieve all birds and ground game up to, and including, hare. These unique qualities have given the Brittany more Dual Champions than any other AKC Sporting Breed, a landmark reached with the 500th in 2006.

Temperament
The Brittany was originally bred as a hunting dog and noted for being easy to train and sweet-natured. The breed is generally more sensitive to correction than other hunters, and harsh corrections are often unnecessary.  Brittanys can become very shy if not thoroughly socialized at a young age, and even among well-socialized dogs there is significant variation in levels of friendliness.

When well socialized, Brittanys are all-around sound dogs, excelling  as companions, family pets, and field dogs. Eager to please and friendly, they generally learn quickly and are loyal and attached to their owners.  They are energetic and need at least an hour of vigorous exercise every day, with many needing more than this. Some animals will be over-active or hyper-sensitive, but these problems are almost invariably due to lack of exercise and training, and are not characteristics of well cared-for dogs.

With more American dual champions (dogs with titles in both conformation shows and field trials) than any other breed, the Brittany maintains strong hunting instincts in all bloodlines.

Health

Brittanys are generally healthy and hardy dogs. The median lifespan for Brittanys in France is 12.6 years. A UK Kennel Club survey puts the breed's median lifespan at 12 years 11 months, with about 1 in 5 dogs dying of old age at an average of 14–15 years.  Brittanys have no undercoat and need minimal grooming or bathing. However, their floppy ears tend to trap moisture in the ear canal and should be cleaned regularly.

Diseases found in the breed include hip dysplasia, with 14.9% of Brittanys tested between 1974 and 2009 by the Orthopedic Foundation for Animals displaying the condition, and a lesser rate of 10.3% for dogs born 2003–2004. The breed is listed among those commonly affected by Canine discoid lupus erythematosus. Epilepsy is also found.

See also
 Dogs portal
 List of dog breeds

References

External links

FCI breeds
Gundogs
Pointers
Dog breeds originating in France